Sherlovaya Gora is an urban locality (urban-type settlement) in Borzinsky District of Zabaykalsky Krai, Russia. Population:

References

Notes

Sources 

 
 
 

Urban-type settlements in Zabaykalsky Krai